Midnight is the fourth studio album by American band Set It Off. The album was released on February 1, 2019 by record label Fearless Records. The deluxe version of the album, subtitled The Final Chapter, was released on June 4, 2021.

Track listing

Charts

References

2019 albums
Set It Off (band) albums
Fearless Records albums